Thomas Jefferson Halsey (May 4, 1863 – March 17, 1951) was a Republican Representative representing Missouri's 6th congressional district from March 4, 1929 – March 3, 1931.

Halsey was born in Dover, Morris County, New Jersey.  His family moved to near Holden, Johnson County, Missouri in 1878.  He attended the Home Academy at Holden, the State Normal School at Warrensburg, and the University of Missouri.

He taught school and engaged in the mercantile business in Holden from 1880 to 1881. He was member of the State Republican committee 1896–1898; delegate to the Republican State conventions in 1896, 1908, and 1912; mayor of Holden 1902–1904.  He moved to Sedalia, Missouri in 1904 engaging in the wholesale tea and coffee business; member of the executive committee of the Missouri State Roads commission 1906-1910.

He moved to Glendale, California in 1910 and returned to Holden in 1911.  He was member of the Holden Board of Education in 1911 and 1912; member of the board of regents, Central Missouri Teachers College at Warrensburg, 1928-1932.

He was elected to Congress in 1928 but failed re-election in 1930. He died in Westfield, New Jersey and is buried in Holden Cemetery in Holden.

References

1863 births
1951 deaths
People from Dover, New Jersey
People from Pettis County, Missouri
People from Sedalia, Missouri
People from Holden, Missouri
University of Central Missouri alumni
University of Missouri alumni
Republican Party members of the United States House of Representatives from Missouri
School board members in Missouri